Henry Bromley may refer to:

H. Thomas Bromley (1853–1924), English lawyer
Henry Bromley (died 1615) (1560–1615), English MP for Plymouth, Worcestershire and Shropshire
Henry Bromley (died 1670) (1632–1670), English MP for Worcestershire
Henry Bromley, 1st Baron Montfort (1705–1755), British landowner and politician
Henry Bromley (writer) (1750?–1814?), real name Anthony Wilson, English writer on art
Henry Bromley (died 1836) (c. 1761–1836), British MP for Worcester, 1806
Sir Henry Bromley, 4th Baronet (1816–1895) of the Bromley baronets
Sir Henry Bromley, 5th Baronet (1849–1905) of the Bromley baronets